The 107th Regiment of Foot was a short-lived infantry regiment of the British Army formed during the French Revolutionary Wars.

It was raised in Ireland on 8 April 1794 as Keating's Regiment of Foot under the command of Maurice Bagenal St Leger Keating. In October of the same year it was numbered as the 107th Regiment of Foot. It was disbanded in 1795.

References

External links

Infantry regiments of the British Army
Military units and formations established in 1794
Military units and formations disestablished in 1795
1794 establishments in Great Britain
1795 disestablishments in Great Britain